The 1945 La Flèche Wallonne was the ninth edition of La Flèche Wallonne cycle race and was held on 3 June 1945. The race started in Mons and finished in Charleroi. The race was won by Marcel Kint.

General classification

References

1945 in road cycling
1945
1945 in Belgian sport